Mandel Kramer (March 12, 1916 – January 29, 1989) was an American actor. As a voice actor, he is best known as the last Johnny Dollar from Yours Truly, Johnny Dollar radio show.

Early years
Kramer grew up in Cleveland, Ohio, where his father had a shoe store, and attended Cleveland Heights High School. He also studied law at Case Western Reserve University for "a couple of years."

Kramer graduated from the American Academy of Dramatic Arts and acted for a year in the Cleveland Play House.

Career
Kramer's first work in radio came at WTAM in his native Cleveland, Ohio.

For 20 years he played police chief Bill Marceau on the soap opera The Edge of Night a role he originated during the shows run on CBS from 1959–1975  & playing the part four years when the show moved to ABC from (1975–1979). His other roles in old-time radio included those shown in the table below. Kramer also appeared in 130 episodes of CBS Radio Mystery Theater between 1974 and 1982.
 

He was also heard on Light of the World, Call the Police, Gang Busters, 21st Precinct and Inner Sanctum Mystery. He once said of his work on Gang Busters that after he began playing criminals, "I probably played more gangsters than anybody in the business for the next 10 or 15 years."

In later years he was often heard on CBS Radio Mystery Theater.

Television
Kramer played Bill Marceau in The Edge of Night on CBS. In 1976, he had become at the time the longest-tenured member of the program's cast, having had the role of Marceau for 17 years. His work earned him a nomination for a Daytime Emmy Award for Supporting Actor in 1979. The only other cast member to surpass him was Ann Flood who played Nancy Karr from 1962–1975 on CBS and  continued playing the part on ABC as well from 1975–1984 for 22 years 2 years longer.

Personal life
In 1939, Kramer was engaged to Ruth Valeche, a fellow graduate of the American Academy of Dramatic Arts. They married and had two daughters, Kathryn and Susan.

References

1916 births
1989 deaths

American voice actors
American male radio actors
20th-century American male actors